The Civil Engineering Contractors Association (CECA) is a United Kingdom construction organisation. Headquartered in London, it was established in November 1996 to represent the interests of civil engineering contractors.

Its membership currently comprises over 350 companies, ranging from small regional businesses to companies operating across the UK and overseas. Collectively, CECA members account for 75-80% of civil engineering work undertaken in the UK.

External links
 CECA website 

Civil engineering organizations
Construction organizations
Business organisations based in London
Organisations based in the City of Westminster